The Mrassu or Mras-Su ( or Мрас-Су́, Pras, Pьras, Pьras-suƣ) is a river in Kemerovo Oblast, Russia. It is a left tributary of the Tom (in the Ob's drainage basin), and has its sources in the Abakan Range. The Mrassu joins the Tom near Myski.

References

Rivers of Kemerovo Oblast